Horsforth is an electoral ward of Leeds City Council in north west Leeds, West Yorkshire, covering the suburb of the same name and a southern part of Rawdon.

Boundaries 
The Horsforth ward includes the civil parish of the same name, also overseen by Horsforth Town Council.

Councillors 

 indicates seat up for re-election.
 indicates seat up for election following resignation or death of sitting councillor.
* indicates incumbent councillor.

Elections since 2010

May 2022

May 2021

May 2019

May 2018

May 2016

May 2015

May 2014

May 2012

May 2011

May 2010

Notes

References

Places in Leeds
Wards of Leeds